Opan Vladamirovich Sat, Cengizhan Erdogan (Turkish name) (born 13 June 1987) is a Tuvan born in Russia Naturalized Turkish freestyle wrestler who won the gold medals at the 2010, 2011 and 2013 FILA Wrestling European Championships. He first won the title in 2010 and repeated his success in 2011 and 2013. Also, he represented Turkey at the 2017 World Wrestling Championships and finished 5th.

In the 2013 European Wrestling Championships he won the title by defeating Vladimir Dubov of Bulgaria 1–0, 2–1, in two straight periods and thus won his third title. He is International Master of Sports in freestyle wrestling.

References

1987 births
Living people
Russian male sport wrestlers